The Dhao language, better known to outsiders by its Rotinese name  (Ndaonese, Ndaundau), is the language of Ndao Island in Indonesia. Traditionally classified as a Sumba language in the Austronesian family, it may actually be a non-Austronesian (Papuan) language. It was once considered a dialect of Hawu, but is not mutually intelligible.

Phonology
Dhao phonology is similar to that of Hawu, but somewhat more complex in its consonants.

Consonants of the  column are apical, those of the  column laminal.  are found in Malay loan words. In a practical orthography developed for writing the language, implosives are written , the affricates  (the dh is slightly retroflex), and the voiced glottal onset as a double vowel. The  is sometimes silent, but contrasts with a glottal stop onset in vowel-initial words within a phrase. Its phonemic status is not clear. It has an "extremely limited distribution", linking noun phrases ( 'small',  'small child') and clauses ( 'and',  'also').

Phonetic long vowels and diphthongs are vowel sequences. The penultimate syllable/vowel is stressed. (Every vowel constitutes a syllable.)

 'this.',  'this',  'thinking',  'senile',  'wind'.

A stressed schwa lengthens the following consonant:  'yesterday',  'night'.

Syllables are consonant-vowel or vowel-only.

f, q, v, w, x, y and z are only used in loanwords and foreign names.

Grammar
Dhao has a nominative–accusative subject–verb–object word order, unlike Hawu. Within noun phrases, modifiers follow the noun. There are a set of independent pronouns, and also a set of pronominal clitics.

When the clitics are used for objects, there are proximal forms in the third person,  'this one' and  'these', the latter also for collective plurals. When used for subjects and the verb begins with a vowel, they drop their vowel with a few irregularities:  'to know'. Many words that translate prepositions in English are verbs in Dhao, and inflect as such.

Demonstratives distinguish proximal (here, now, this), distal (there, then, that), and remote (yonder, yon). 

Sample clauses.

Notes

References

External links 
 Alphabet and pronunciation

Savu languages
Languages of Indonesia